Jonathan Diego Menéndez (born 5 March 1994), commonly known as Jony, is an Argentine professional footballer who plays for Newell's Old Boys on loan from Real Salt Lake.

Football career
Born in Buenos Aires, Jony started his career with hometown's Chacarita Juniors, and made his debut as a professional on 5 June 2011, starting in a 0–0 draw at Boca Unidos in the Primera B Nacional. He appeared in two further matches during the campaign, as his side finished in a comfortable mid-table position.

On 1 February 2012 Jony moved abroad for the first time in his career, joining Sevilla FC. However, due to bureaucratic problems, he only played for the Juvenil squad.

Jony was promoted to the Andalusians' reserve squad in the 2012 summer, becoming a starter afterwards.

Jony was acquired by Major League Soccer club Real Salt Lake on May 29, 2021. He reportedly signed a 3–year contract with the Utah team. On 12 July 2022, Jony was loaned to Vélez Sarsfield for the remainder of 2022. On 6 February 2023, Jony was recalled from his loan to Velez and loaned to Newell's Old Boys for the 2023 season.

Personal life
Jonathan is the twin brother of fellow footballer Nahuel Menéndez.

References

External links
 
 
 

1994 births
Living people
Footballers from Buenos Aires
Argentine footballers
Association football forwards
Chacarita Juniors footballers
Talleres de Córdoba footballers
Sevilla Atlético players
Club Atlético Independiente footballers
Al-Rayyan SC players
Argentine Primera División players
Primera Nacional players
Segunda División B players
Qatar Stars League players
Argentine expatriate footballers
Argentine expatriate sportspeople in Spain
Argentine expatriate sportspeople in Qatar
Expatriate footballers in Spain
Expatriate footballers in Qatar
Major League Soccer players
Real Salt Lake players
Twin sportspeople
Club Atlético Vélez Sarsfield footballers
Newell's Old Boys footballers